Giorgi Ivanishvili  (born 18 October 1989) is a Georgian football player who plays as a winger.

He has also played for AC Bellinzona in Switzerland. He was also an international player for the Georgia national under-21 football team.

Career

Club career
Ahead of the 2019/20, Ivanishvili joined FC Sioni Bolnisi. He then moved to FC Torpedo Kutaisi in February 2020.

References

External links
 
  UEFA Profile

1989 births
Living people
Footballers from Georgia (country)
Expatriate footballers from Georgia (country)
Association football forwards
FC Zürich players
FC Wohlen players
AC Bellinzona players
FC Spartaki Tskhinvali players
FC Chikhura Sachkhere players
FC Dinamo Tbilisi players
Zagłębie Sosnowiec players
FC Sioni Bolnisi players
FC Torpedo Kutaisi players
Erovnuli Liga players
Ekstraklasa players
Swiss Challenge League players
Expatriate footballers in Switzerland
Expatriate footballers in Poland
Expatriate sportspeople from Georgia (country) in Switzerland
Expatriate sportspeople from Georgia (country) in Poland